Robert Huston Milroy (June 11, 1816 – March 29, 1890) was a lawyer, judge, and a Union Army general in the American Civil War, most noted for his defeat at the Second Battle of Winchester in 1863.

Early life
Milroy was born on a farm near the hamlet of Canton, five miles east of Salem, Indiana, but the family moved to Carroll County in 1826. He graduated from Norwich Academy in Vermont in 1843. He moved to Texas in 1845, returning to Indiana in 1847. He was a captain in the 1st Indiana Volunteers during the Mexican War, but did not see any combat action. He graduated from Indiana University Law School in 1850 and became a lawyer and judge in Rensselaer, Indiana.

Civil War
Just before Abraham Lincoln was inaugurated, Milroy recruited a company for the 9th Indiana Militia with men living around Rensselaer and was appointed its captain soon after Fort Sumter, but on April 27, 1861, he was appointed to the Federal service as colonel of the 9th Indiana Infantry. He took part in the western Virginia campaign under Maj. Gen. George B. McClellan and was promoted to brigadier general on September 3, 1861. He commanded the Cheat Mountain District of the Mountain Department and served as a brigade commander in the Mountain Department during Stonewall Jackson's Valley Campaign of 1862. Milroy commanded another brigade in Maj. Gen. John Pope's Army of Virginia for the Second Battle of Bull Run. He was promoted to major general on March 10, 1863, to rank from November 29, 1862.

On May 8–9, 1862, Milroy led Union forces in the Battle of McDowell against Maj. Gen. Thomas J. "Stonewall" Jackson. Milroy's "spoiling attack" surprised Jackson, seized the initiative, and inflicted heavier casualties, but did not drive the Confederates from their position.

Milroy led a brigade at the Battle of Cross Keys on June 8, 1862.  His brigade consisted of 5 Virginia regiments loyal to the Union (later designated as West Virginia units,) 1 Ohio regiments and 3 Ohio artillery batteries.

At Second Bull Run, Milroy faced Jackson once again; leading his brigade into a gap in the Confederate line, he managed to surprise the brigade of Brig. Gen Isaac Trimble, but was driven back by reinforcements and lost 300 men in the process.

The low point of Milroy's military career was during the early days of the Gettysburg Campaign. He commanded the 2nd Division of the VIII Corps, Middle Department, from February 1863 until June. During the Second Battle of Winchester, he was outmaneuvered and "gobbled up" by the Confederate corps of Lt. Gen. Richard S. Ewell, the vanguard of Gen. Robert E. Lee's Army of Northern Virginia on its way north to invade Pennsylvania. Although ordered to withdraw his 6,900-man garrison from Winchester, he chose to remain in the face of the Confederate invasion, assuming that the fortifications of Winchester would withstand any assault or siege.

General-in-chief Henry W. Halleck never favored this "forward" position, so far from the Baltimore and Ohio Railroad, and he wanted Milroy to withdraw his 6,900-man garrison from Winchester. The commander of VIII Corps, Major General Robert Schenck, was seemingly undecided and gave contradicting orders on the evacuation of Winchester, as Milroy convinced Schenck that he could hold Winchester and its extensive fortifications against any Confederate invasion, for months if necessary. Schenck capitulated and left Milroy with a final telegram to wait further orders. The telegraph wire into Winchester was cut by Confederate raiders.

As Ewell's Confederate Second Corps closed in on Winchester, Milroy was further blinded by the fact that his vedettes and pickets were not extensively placed in the surrounding territory, due to heavy and repeated bushwhacking of his men, and he never realized that an entire Confederate corps was bearing down upon him. A fanatic Presbyterian and abolitionist, Milroy believed that eradicating slavery was God's will and that secessionists needed to be punished in an Old Testament fashion. His maltreatment of Winchester citizens had been such that even many pro-Unionists had changed their sympathies, serving to further isolate Milroy's ability to gather intelligence around him.

On June 15, 1863, Milroy escaped with his staff, but over 3,000 of his men were captured, as were all of his artillery pieces and 300 supply wagons. He was called before a court of inquiry to answer for his actions, but after ten months he was relieved of any culpability for the debacle.

During the attack on Winchester, Milroy's horse was hit by an exploding shell. He was thrown from the saddle and bruised his left hip in the process, but did not seek any medical attention and instead merely mounted another horse.

After this period of inactivity, Milroy was transferred to the Western Theater, recruiting for Maj. Gen. George Henry Thomas's Army of the Cumberland in Nashville in the spring of 1864. Much like in western Virginia, Milroy gained a reputation for his harsh treatment of civilians and frequent banishments and public executions of those who expressed pro-Confederate sympathies. He also commanded the Defenses of the Nashville and Chattanooga Railroad in the Department of the Cumberland until the end of the war. Although it was not anticipated that this would be a combat assignment, he fought briefly in the Third Battle of Murfreesboro, part of the Franklin-Nashville Campaign in 1864. Anxious to reduce some of the stigma of Winchester, he ordered the 13th Indiana Cavalry to make a mounted charge directly at an enemy artillery position, assuming that it was only a portion of Maj. Gen. Nathan Bedford Forrest's dismounted cavalry. The Hoosiers suffered heavy casualties. When Milroy realized that he was facing not cavalry, but an infantry division of Maj. Gen. Benjamin F. Cheatham's corps, he returned to the safety of "Fortress Rosecrans" in Murfreesboro. The following day General Lovell H. Rousseau, commander of all Union forces in the Murfreesboro area, reinforced Milroy with two infantry brigades.  Milroy attacked and routed the combined Confederate infantry and cavalry.  The battle was "well conducted by Maj. Gen. Milroy" in the words of General Rousseau. Milroy resigned his commission on July 26, 1865.

Postbellum career
After the war, Milroy was a trustee of the Wabash and Erie Canal Company and, from 1872 to 1875, he was the superintendent of Indian Affairs in the Washington Territory and an Indian agent for the following ten years. During this time he was active in ensuring that the aging Yakama chief, Kamiakin, would not be evicted from his ancestral land by area ranchers.

Not long after the war ended, Milroy began suffering extensive pain from his hip injury at Winchester which worsened as he got older, eventually impairing his mobility and requiring him to use a cane. Doctors diagnosed his condition as chronic inflammation of the ligaments around the hip joint. Milroy died from heart failure in Olympia, Washington on May 29, 1890, and is buried in the Masonic Memorial Park at Tumwater, Washington.

He was the author of Papers of General Robert Huston Milroy, published posthumously in 1965 and 1966.

Commemoration
Milroy is the namesake of the city of Milroy, Minnesota.

See also

List of American Civil War generals (Union)
White Top, on which Fort Milroy — named for the General — was emplaced.

Notes

References
 Eicher, John H., and David J. Eicher, Civil War High Commands, Stanford University Press, 2001, .
 Fremantle, Arthur Lyon, Three Months in the Southern States: April–June 1863, New York: John Bradburn, 1864.
 Sword, Wiley, The Confederacy's Last Hurrah: Spring Hill, Franklin, and Nashville, University Press of Kansas, 1992, .
 Warner, Ezra J., Generals in Blue: Lives of the Union Commanders, Louisiana State University Press, 1964, .

Further reading
 Grunder, Charles S. and Brandon H. Beck, The Battle of Second Winchester, H.E. Howard, Inc., .

External links

General Milroy Collection - Jasper County (Indiana) Public Library

1816 births
1890 deaths
People from Rensselaer, Indiana
People from Washington County, Indiana
People of Indiana in the American Civil War
Indiana lawyers
Union Army generals
Indiana University Maurer School of Law alumni
Norwich University alumni